Don (all from Latin , roughly 'Lord'), abbreviated as D., is an honorific prefix primarily used in Spain and Hispanic America, and with different connotations also in Italy, Portugal and its former colonies, and Croatia.

Don is derived from the Latin dominus: a master of a household, a title with background from the Roman Republic in classical antiquity. With the abbreviated form having emerged as such in the Middle Ages, traditionally it is reserved for Catholic clergy and nobles, in addition to certain educational authorities and persons of distinction. Dom is the variant used in Portuguese.

The female equivalent is Doña, Donna, Doamnă (Romanian) and Dona abbreviated D.ª, Da., or simply D. It is a common honorific reserved for women, especially mature women. In Portuguese "Dona" tends to be less restricted in use to women than "Dom" is to men.

In Britain and Ireland, especially at Oxford, Cambridge, and Dublin, the word is used for a college fellow or tutor, but it is not used as an honorific prefix.

Usage

General
In Spanish, although originally a title reserved for royalty, select nobles, and church hierarchs, it is now often used as a mark of esteem for a person of personal, social or official distinction, such as a community leader of long standing, a person of significant wealth, or a noble, but may also be used ironically. As a style, rather than a title or rank, it is used with, rather than in place of, a person's name.

Syntactically, in Spanish, don and doña are used in a way similar to "mister" (señor) and "missus" (señora), but convey a higher degree of reverence, although not necessarily as high as knightly or noble titles such as "lord" and "dame". Unlike "The Honourable" in English (but like the English "Sir" for a knight or baronet), Don may be used when speaking directly to a person, and unlike "mister" it must be used with a given name. For example, "Don Diego de la Vega" or simply "Don Diego" (the secret identity of Zorro) are typical forms. But a form using the last name (e.g. "Don de la Vega") is not considered correct and rarely would be used by Spanish speakers ("señor de la Vega" would be used instead).

Today in the Spanish language, Doña is used to respectfully refer to a mature woman. In present-day Hispanic America, the title Don or Doña is sometimes used in honorific form when addressing a senior citizen. In some countries, Don or Doña may be used as a generic honorific, similar to Sir and Madam in the United States.

Spanish-speaking countries and territories 
Historically, don was used to address members of the nobility, e.g. hidalgos, as well as members of the secular clergy. The treatment gradually came to be reserved for persons of the blood royal, and those of such acknowledged high or ancient aristocratic birth as to be noble de Juro e Herdade, that is, "by right and heredity" rather than by the king's grace. However, there were rare exemptions to the rule, such as the mulatto Miguel Enríquez, who received the distinction from Philip V due to his privateering work in the Caribbean. But by the twentieth century it was no longer restricted in use even to the upper classes, since persons of means or education (at least of a "bachiller" level), regardless of background, came to be so addressed and, it is now often used as if it were a more formal version of Señor, a term which was also once used to address someone with the quality of nobility (not necessarily holding a nobiliary title). This was, for example, the case of military leaders addressing Spanish troops as "señores soldados" (gentlemen-soldiers).

Don would roughly translate to "mister" or "esquire".

Spain 
During the reign of King Juan Carlos of Spain from 1975 until his abdication as monarch on 19 June 2014, he was titled Su Majestad [S. M.] el Rey Juan Carlos (His Majesty King Juan Carlos). Following the abdication, Juan Carlos and his wife are titled, according to the Royal Household website, S. M. el Rey Don Juan Carlos (H.M. King Juan Carlos) and S. M. la Reina Doña Sofía (H.M. Queen Sofía)—the same as during his reign, with the honorific Don/Doña prefixed to the names. Juan Carlos' successor is S. M. el Rey Felipe VI.

Sephardi Jews 
The honorific was also used among Ladino-speaking Sephardi Jews, as part of the Spanish culture which they took with them after the expulsion of the Jews from Spain in 1492.

Hispanic America 
The honorific title Don was widely used in Crown documents throughout Hispanic America by those in nobility or landed gentry. It can be found in the many ‘Padrones’ and “Aguas y Tierras” records in Mexican archives. The honorific in modern times is also widely used throughout the Americas. This is the case of the Mexican New Age author Don Miguel Ángel Ruiz, the Chilean television personality Don Francisco, and the Puerto Rican industrialist and politician Don Luis Ferré, among many other figures.  Although Puerto Rican politician Pedro Albizu Campos had a doctoral degree, he has been titled Don. Likewise, Puerto Rican Governor Luis Muñoz Marín has often been called Don Luís Muñoz Marin instead of Governor Muñoz Marin. In the same manner, Don Miguel Ángel Ruiz is an M.D. Additionally the honorific is usually used with people of older age.

The same happens in other Hispanic American countries. For example, despite having a doctoral degree in theology, the Paraguayan dictator José Gaspar Rodríguez de Francia was usually styled as "Don". Likewise, despite being a respected military commander with the rank of Brigade General, Argentine Ruler Juan Manuel de Rosas was formally and informally styled "Don" as a more important title.

Prior to the American ownership of the Southwest, a number of Americans immigrated to California, where they often became Mexican citizens and changed their given names to Spanish equivalents, for example "Juan Temple" for Jonathan Temple. It was common for them to assume the honorific "don" once they had attained a significant degree of distinction in the community.

Italy 
Officially, Don was the honorific for a principe or a duca (and any legitimate, male-line descendant thereof) who was a member of the nobility (as distinct from a reigning prince or duke, who was generally entitled to some form of the higher style of Altezza). This was how the style was used in the Almanach de Gotha for extant families in its third section.  The last official Italian nobility law (abrogated 1948) stated that the style belonged to members of the following groups:
 those whose main title was principe or duca;
 those who had a special grant;
 those to whom it had been recognized by the former Lombardy (Duchy of Milan); or
 those from the Kingdom of Sardinia who bore either a title of hereditary knight or of the titled nobility (whatever the main title of the family). 
Genealogical databases and dynastic works still reserve the title for this class of noble by tradition, although it is no longer a right under Italian law.

In practice, however, the style Don/Donna (or Latin Dominus/Domina) was used more loosely in church, civil and notarial records. The honorific was often accorded to the untitled gentry (e.g., knights or younger sons of noblemen), priests, or other people of distinction. It was, over time, adopted by organized criminal societies in Southern Italy (including Naples, Sicily, and Calabria) to refer to members who held considerable sway within their hierarchies.

In modern Italy, the title is usually only given to Roman Catholic diocesan priests (never to prelates, who bear higher honorifics such as monsignore, eminenza, and so on). In Sardinia, until recently it was commonly used for nobility (whether titled or not), but it is being presently used mainly when the speaker wants to show that he  knows the don's condition of nobility.

Outside of the priesthood or old nobility, usage is still common in Southern Italy, mostly as an honorific form to address the elderly, but it is rarely, if ever, used in Central Italy or Northern Italy. It can be used satirically or ironically to lampoon a person's sense of self-importance. 

Don is prefixed either to the full name or to the person's given name. The form "Don Lastname" for crime bosses (as in Don Corleone) is an American custom. In Southern Italy, mafia bosses are addressed as "Don Firstname" by other mafiosi and sometimes their victims as well, while the press usually refers to them as "Firstname Lastname", without the honorific.

Priests are the only ones to be referred as "Don" plus the last name (e.g. Don Marioni), although when talking directly to them they are usually addressed as "Don" plus the first name (e.g. Don Francesco), which is also the most common form used by parishioners when referring to their priest.

Portuguese-speaking countries and territories
The usage of Dom was a prerogative of princes of royal blood and also of other individuals to whom it had been granted by the sovereign. In most cases, the title was passed on through the male line. Strictly speaking, only females born of a nobleman bearing the title Dom would be addressed as Dona (D.ª), but the style was not heritable through daughters. The few exceptions depended solely on the conditions upon which the title itself had been granted. A well-known exception is the descent of Dom Vasco da Gama.

There were many cases, both in Portugal and Brazil, in which the title of Dom (or Dona) was conceded to, and even bought by, people who were not from royalty. In any case, when the title was officially recognized by the proper authority, it became part of the name.

In Portugal and Brazil, Dom is used for certain higher members hierarchs, such as superiors, of the Roman Catholic and Greek Orthodox churches. In Catholic religious orders, such as the Order of Saint Benedict, it is also associated with the status of Dom Frater.  Dom is similarly used as an honorific for Benedictine monks within the Benedictine Order throughout France and the English speaking world, such as the famous Dom Pérignon. In France, it is also used within the male branch of the Carthusian Order.

It is also employed for laymen who belong to the royal and imperial families (for example the House of Aviz in Portugal and the House of Braganza in Portugal and Brazil). It was also accorded to members of families of the titled Portuguese nobility. Unless ennobling letters patent specifically authorised its use, Dom was not attributed to members of Portugal's untitled nobility: Since hereditary titles in Portugal descended according to primogeniture, the right to the style of Dom was the only apparent distinction between cadets of titled families and members of untitled noble families.

In the Portuguese language, the feminine form, Dona (or, more politely, Senhora Dona), has become common when referring to a woman who does not hold an academic title. It is commonly used to refer to First Ladies, although it is less common for female politicians.

Croatia
Within the Catholic Church, the prefix Don is usually used for the diocesan priests with their first name, as well as velečasni (The Reverend).

Religion
Dom is used as a title in English for certain Benedictine (including some communities which follow the Rule of St. Benedict) and Carthusian monks, and for members of certain communities of Canons Regular. Examples include Benedictine monks of the English Benedictine Congregation (e.g. Dom John Chapman, late Abbot of Downside). Since the Second Vatican Council, the title can be given to any monk (lay or ordained) who has made a solemn profession. The equivalent title for a nun is "Dame" (e.g. Dame Laurentia McLachlan, late Abbess of Stanbrook, or Dame Felicitas Corrigan, author).

Academia

United Kingdom
The honorific Don is used for fellows and tutors of a college or university, especially traditional collegiate universities such as Oxford and Cambridge in England. Teachers at Radley, a boys-only boarding-only public school modelled after Oxford colleges of the early 19th century, are known to boys as "dons".

Like the don used for Roman Catholic priests, this usage derives from the Latin dominus, meaning "lord", a historical remnant of Oxford and Cambridge having started as ecclesiastical institutions in the Middle Ages. The earliest use of the word in this sense appears, according to the New English Dictionary, in Souths Sermons (1660). An English corruption, "dan", was in early use as a title of respect, equivalent to master. The particular literary application to poets is due to Edmund Spenser's use of "Dan Chaucer, well of English undefiled."

Canada
At some universities in Canada, such as the University of King's College and the University of New Brunswick, a don is the senior head of a university residence.  At these institutions, a don is typically a faculty member, staff member, or postgraduate student, whose responsibilities in the residence are primarily administrative.  The don supervises their residence and a team of undergraduate resident assistants, proctors, or other student employees.

In other Canadian institutions, such as Huron College and the University of Toronto, a don is a resident assistant, typically an upper-year student paid a stipend to act as an advisor to and supervisor of the students in a university residence.

United States
At Sarah Lawrence College, faculty advisors are referred to as "dons". Dons meet regularly with students to plan a course of study.

The "Don" is also an official mascot of the athletic teams of the University of San Francisco,  Spanish Fork High School, Arroyo High School, and Amador Valley High School.

In popular culture
In the United States, Don has also been made popular by films depicting the Italian mafia, such as The Godfather trilogy, where the crime boss is given by his associates the same signs of respect that were traditionally granted in Italy to nobility. However, the honorific followed by the last name (e.g. Don Corleone) would be used in Italy for priests only: the proper Italian respectful form is similar to the Spanish-language form in that it is applied only to the first name (e.g. "Don Vito"). This title has in turn been applied by the media to real-world mafia figures, such as the nickname "Teflon Don" for John Gotti.

See also 

 Dominus (title)

References

Academic terminology
Academic titles
Ecclesiastical styles
Education and training occupations
Italian words and phrases
Men's social titles
Noble titles
Organized crime members by role
Portuguese words and phrases
Social history of Italy
Spanish words and phrases
Styles (forms of address)
Don
Don